Katharina Sutter (born 27 July 1968) is a Swiss bobsledder who has competed since the late 1990s. She won three medals at the FIBT World Championships with one gold (Two-woman: 2001) and two bronzes (Two-woman: 2000, Mixed team: 2007).

Burdet also finished fourth in the two-woman event at the 2002 Winter Olympics in Salt Lake City.

References
2002 bobsleigh two-woman results
Bobsleigh two-woman world championship medalists since 2000
FIBT profile
Mixed bobsleigh-skeleton world championship medalists since 2007

1968 births
Living people
Swiss female bobsledders
Bobsledders at the 2002 Winter Olympics
Olympic bobsledders of Switzerland
20th-century Swiss women